Tinguipaya is a small town in Bolivia, Potosí Department, Tomás Frías Province. It is the seat of the Tinguipaya Municipality.

References

Populated places in Potosí Department